Arthur Edward Ochse (11 March 1870 – 11 April 1918), played Test cricket in the first matches played by South Africa in 1888–89.

Life and career
A middle-order batsman, Ochse, like the rest of the South African team, made his first-class debut in his country's first Test match, which was played against England at Port Elizabeth.  At 19 years and 1 day old, he was South Africa's youngest Test debutant (a record since surpassed) and he retained his place for the second Test played two weeks later.  But like so many of his teammates, his inexperience against such good opposition showed.  In four innings against Major Warton's team, Ochse scored just 16 runs as England ran out comprehensive winners in South Africa's first two representative matches played on level terms.  During the second innings of the second Test, played at Cape Town, Ochse was bowled by England's slow left arm spinner, Johnny Briggs, one of Briggs' eight victims in a then Test record of eight wickets for 11 runs in an innings (and 15 for 28 in a match).

Domestically, Ochse played for Transvaal, once in 1891 and twice more in 1895. In the match against Kimberley at Johannesburg in the Currie Cup season of 1890/91, he was unlucky to miss out on a maiden century when, in the second innings, he fell one run short.  He also scored 45 in Transvaal's first innings and took two wickets in the match.

Ochse served in the South African Infantry during World War I. He was killed in action at Messines Ridge on the Western Front during Germany's 1918 Spring Offensive.

See also
 Arthur Lennox Ochse

References

External links

Sources
 World Cricketers – A Biographical Dictionary by Christopher Martin-Jenkins published by Oxford University Press (1996)
 The Wisden Book of Test Cricket, Volume 1 (1877–1977) compiled and edited by Bill Frindall published by Headline Book Publishing (1995)

1870 births
1918 deaths
People from Graaff-Reinet
South Africa Test cricketers
South African cricketers
Gauteng cricketers
South African military personnel killed in World War I
Cricketers from the Eastern Cape